The Poznań tram system is a tramway operated by  (MPK Poznań; Public Transport Company in Poznań Ltd.). It currently has 20 daytime lines, one night line, and one tourist line served by historical vehicles. With a few exceptions the tramlines operate on double tracks rail.

In local Poznań dialect trams are called bimby (pl.), bimba (sing).

History

Horse trams (1880-1898)
The idea of trams in Poznań was brought to fruition by two businessmen from Berlin: Otto Reymer and Otto Masch. After receiving concessions from the town authorities on 30 July 1880 they began running a horse tram in Poznań. On the next day the first regular line transported passengers from the main train station via ul. Św. Marcin/St. Martin Str., ul. Rycerska/Ritter Str. (today ul. Ratajczaka), Pl. Wilhelmowski/Wilhelms Platz (currently Plac Wolności) to Rynek/Ring (currently Stary Rynek ). The route was soon lengthened from Rynek/Ring to ul. Butelska/Büttel Str. (now ul. Woźna), ul. Wielkie Garbary/Grosse Gerber Str. (currently ul. Garbary), Chwaliszewo to Ostrów Tumski. At the same time a branch was built via ul. Wiktorii/Victoria Str. (modern ul. Gwarna and ul. Mielżyńskiego), Plac Królewski/Königs Platz (currently Pl. Cyryla Ratajskiego), ul. Fryderykowska/Friedrich Str. (modern ul. 23 Lutego), Al. Wilhelmowskie/Wilhelms Al. (currently Al. Marcinkowskiego), ul. Seekta/Seekt Str. (modern ul. Solna) and Wolnica, ul. Małe Garbary/Kleine Gerber Str., ul. Szewska, ul. Szeroka/Breite Str. (currently ul. Wielka) to ul. Wielkie Garbary/Grosse Gerber Str. (modern ul. Garbary) where it joined the older route.

Despite the need for modern public transport in the city, after a few weeks the company found itself on the edge of bankruptcy. There were two reasons for this: firstly the branch route had too few passengers, and secondly all the signs in the trams were only in German, leading to a boycott by the Polish majority. The financially troubled company was bought by the Poznań Horse Railway Society, which obtained a concession and monopoly on tram transportation in the city. At that time there were only 20 cars in service.

In September 1880 the Society bought part of the site of the former train station in Jeżyce/Jersitz suburb, where a tram depot was built (currently it is the oldest tram depot still in service in Poland). In 1896 two new routes were built. The first ran from Rynek/Ring (now Stary Rynek), via ul. Wrocławska/Breslauer Str., Pl. Piotra/Peters Platz (now Pl. Wiosny Ludów), ul. Półwiejska to Brama Wildecka/Wilda Thor. The second went from the tram depot on ul. Gajowa, through ul. Zwierzyniecka/Zoologisher Str., ul. Jadwigi/Hedwigs Str. (modern ul. Kraszewskiego) to Rynek Jeżycki/Jersitz Markt, after one year extended via ul. Wielka Berlińska/Grosse Berliner Str. (modern ul. Dąbrowskiego) to the chemical factory on ul. Polna/Feld Str. Both routes were already built to carry heavier electric cars.

Electric trams
On 6 March 1898 horse trams were replaced by electric ones. At this time there were three lines:
 white - like the old horse tram from the train station via Rynek/Ring to Ostrów Tumski
 red - from Rynek Jeżycki/Jersitz Markt via ul. Jadwigi/Hedwigs Str., ul. Zwierzyniecka/Zoologischer Str., ul. Św. Marcin/St. Martin Str. and along the old horse tram route to Rynek/Ring and Brama Wildecka/Wilda Thor
 yellow - from the train station like the white line but only as far as the intersection of ul. Szeroka/Breite Str. and ul. Wielkie Garbary/Grosse Gerber Str.
In April a fourth line was added:
 green - from Rynek/Ring via ul. Św. Marcin/St. Martin Str. and the new route on ul. Głogowska/Gloger Str. to Górczyn suburb (today's intersection of ul. Głogowska and ul. Kosynierska).
A ticket cost 10 or 20 pfennigs and after 11 pm the price was doubled.
 
In 1899 a second track was added to the routes on Rynek/Ring and ul. Wielka Berlińska/Grosse Berliner Str. (modern ul. Dąbrowskiego).

Before World War I the tram network was extended to the Municipal Slaughterhouse on ul. Wielkie Garbary/Grosse Gerber Str., to Plac Sapieżyński/Sapeicha Platz (today Plac Wielkopolski), to Brama Dębińska/Eichwald Thor (currently the intersection of ul. Strzelecka and Krakowska), to Śródka, Sołacz and Dębiec (to the Cegielski Factory). New routes were also built in the centre of the city, including overpasses over the railway tracks: Most Teatralny and Most Dworcowy.

Between the wars new routes were built to Golęcin, Dębiec (extension of existing tracks), Dębina (to the public beach on the bank of the Warta), Ogrody, Grunwald and Winiary. In this same period some routes in the narrow streets of the Old Town were closed. A planned route to Główna was cancelled due to the opening in 1930 of a trolleybus line there.

After World War II

During the battle of Poznań in 1945, most of the cars and tracks were destroyed. Tram transportation was partially restored two years after the war, in 1947, though only on the left bank of the Warta. The tracks in the old town were not rebuilt, but a new route was laid via Plac Bernardyński.

The first post-war tram on the right bank appeared in 1952, when the new Marchlewski Bridge was opened (now called Most Królowej Jadwigi).

In the following years new routes connecting different districts and bypassing the centre of city were built:
 1955-1957 via ul. Marchlewskiego (now ul. Królowej Jadwigi)
 1968-1973 via ul. Przybyszewskiego, ul. Reymonta and ul. Hetmańska
 1974-1977 from Plac Wielkopolski via ul. Małe Garbary,  ul. Estkowskiego to Rondo Śródka.
 1983-1985 from os. Lecha via ul. Jedności Słowiańskiej (today Chartowo and Żegrze) to ul. Hetmańska
Also some lines to peripheral districts were built:
 1949-1950 to the communal cemetery in Junikowo
 1957-1964 via ul. Pułaskiego and ul. Winogrady to ul. Wilczak (a branch to ul. Serbska was added in 1974)
 1955 from Rataje to the Stomil Factory in Starołęka, in 1967 extended to 'Poznań Starołęka' train station
 1959 to Zawady via Śródka with a branch to os. Warszawskie, extended in 1974 to Miłostowo
 1979 to Chartowo and Osiedle Lecha
 1980 to Winiary and ul. Piątkowska

A revolution for public transport in Poznań was brought about by the opening in 1997 of the 6.1 km long Poznański Szybki Tramwaj route, nicknamed "Pestka" by locals. Currently there are several plans for extension of the network, at different stages of preparation. Of great importance for tram transportation in Poznań was the general strategy for city development from 1994. According to this document trams are to serve as the fundamental mode of transport in the city. Since then, during renovations of streets and traffic lights, trams have been given right of way at intersections.

On 14 August 2007 a long new route opened, as the first section of the so-called Ratajski Szybki Tramwaj. The new route connects Plac Wiosny Ludów via ul. Podgórna, ul. Dowbora Muśnickiego, ul. Mostowa, Most św. Rocha and ul. Kórnicka to ul. Jana Pawła II.

In 2011, MPK decided to sell 40 type 105Na trams due to lack of space in the depots for this type of trams. In addition, 45 Solaris Tramino trams were ordered along with 7 Moderus Beta trams.

On 11 August 2012 the final section of the route to Franowo opened, connecting the area of the former terminus loop at os. Lech with a new loop in Franowo. Part of the route runs through the 800m Franowo tunnel. At Franowo there is also a large, modern depot.

On 1 September 2013 an extension of the PST route was opened which runs parallel to the railway line between Poznan Główny station and Głogowska. This uses space that became available from the former platform 7 at the station.

In 2019 all remaining Konstal 105Na and Duewag GT8 trams are scheduled to be replaced by newer Moderus Gamma LF02AC trams

Rolling stock

Historical fleet:
 horse car Herbrand B3/H0 built in 1880 (several times rebuilt)
 Konstal N upgraded to Konstal 4NJ (with similarly upgraded Konstal ND attachment) (#286, #436, #456, #689)
 Konstal 102N (#1)
 Konstal 102Na (#71)
 Konstal 105N (#81+#82)
 Duewag GT8 (#702, #707)
 Duewag GT6 (#2513)
 Fuchs KSW (#158)

Cars awaiting renovation:
 Konstal N
 Konstal 13N
 Beijnes 3G (#805)
 Konstal 105Na (#280, #292, #318)

Retired cars:
 Konstal 13N (#115, withdrawn in 2010)
 HCP 115N (scrapped in August 2011)
 HCP Puma 118N (withdrawn and given back to H. Cegielski – Poznań at the end of 2012)

Tram lines

Depots

ul Głogowska depot
This is the second largest tram depot in Poznan (after Franowo). It was built in 1907 and underwent modernisation between 1998 and 2000 in preparation for low floor trams. It is close to the tram stop Krauthofera.

Starołęka
This depot opened in 1980 at the Starołęka terminus. The construction began in 1974

Franowo
This is the largest and newest depot in Poznan, opened on 11 May 2014. The depot has space for 100 trams.

The following depots have now closed:

ul. Gajowa. This depot opened in 1880 and closed on 28 December 2010. (Reason: Sold in 2008, Because the Portuguese Investor Was Demanding Too Much Money From The Operator To Use The Depot)
Budziszyńska. This was an overflow depot for ul. Głogowska and Madalińskiego. The depot closed on 4 November 2012. (Opened in 1985. Construction Began in 1982, To solve the issue of the lack of space of the 60s, 70s, and 80s. the reason was the trams that were At Bolesława Krzywoustego, Zwierzyniecka, Rondo Rataje, Przybyszewskiego and Towarowa were Vandalised
ul Madalińskiego. This depot was built between 1947 and 1955 and closed on 14 December 2014. It was the smallest depot MPK operated. It is now used for the historical fleet.
ul. Bolesława Krzywoustego. This depot was used in the 1980s and was located between Rondo Rataje and ul. Pleszewskiej.

Plans for further extension 

Currently in Poznań there are several plans to extend the tram network; some of them are only planned, others are under construction:

extension of the line from Ogrody along ul. Dąbrowskiego to al. Polska with new tram/bus station at the end of the route
extension of route from Zawady alongside ul. Zawady and ul. Główna to Poznań Wschód station
extension of route from Dębiec via ul. 28. Czerwca 1956 r. to os. Dębina
new route via ul. Ratajczaka, Pl. Cyryla Ratajskiego, ul. Solna and ul. Nowowiejskiego
new route to os. Kopernika alongside ul. Arciszewskiego and ul. Pogodna and new route on ul. Szpitalna and ul. Grochowska
new route form Rondo Żegrze to ul. Falista
new route from ul. Garbary through ul. Szelągowska and ul. Naramowickiej to Naramowice connected with existing line to ul. Wilczak

Gallery

References

Maria Trzeciakowska, Lech Trzeciakowski, W dziewiętnastowiecznym Poznaniu. Życie codzienne miasta 1815-1914, Poznań 1982, Wydawnictwo Poznańskie 
Jerzy Topolski, Lech Trzeciakowski (red) Dzieje Poznania, tom II cz. 1 1793-1918, Warszawa-Poznań 1994, Państwowe Wydawnictwo Naukowe 
Jerzy Topolski, Lech Trzeciakowski (red) Dzieje Poznania, tom II cz. 2 1918-1945, Warszawa-Poznań 1998, Państwowe Wydawnictwo Naukowe

Notes

External links

 MPK Poznań – official website

Poznan
Transport in Poznań
Poznan